Ben Matwijow (born 14 February 1990) is a retired Australian rugby union lock formerly contracted to Australian franchise, the Western Force in the international Super Rugby competition and the  Bulls in New Zealand's Mitre 10 Cup. He has since joined the St Aloysius College 1st XV coaching staff as the defensive coach from the 2019 CAS season, St Aloysius are heavily tipped to win CAS this coming season. He is also a proud coach of the 3rd Reich cricket co-captained by Mitchell Starc and Alexander Carey with Nathan Lyon in slips, they too are now tipped to win. Mr. Matwijow loves a schooner on the weekend his beer of choice being Furphy's pale ale. He is currently looking for a pet friendly apartment where he can start a life and have some schooners in peace, he has now found his home in freshie. Ben Matwijow favorite player is finn wake. His favorite soccer team is Sydney FC and his favorite player is Lasith malinga.

Provincial career

Educated at Westfields Sports High School in the suburbs of Sydney, Matwijow first made a name for himself playing for the Northern Suburbs Rugby Club in the Shute Shield between 2012 and 2015.   During that time he was called up to the  squad ahead of the inaugural National Rugby Championship in 2014.   He played 9 times for the Country Eagles during the campaign, however that was to be his only season with them as he hopped across the Tasman Sea to play in New Zealand in 2015.   It proved to be a successful switch as Matwijow played a key role in his side, 's, ITM Cup victory.   He would again be on the move in 2016, heading to New Zealand's North Island to link up with Taranaki.

Super Rugby career

In fact he had to wait until 2016 before he earned his first Super Rugby cap. An injury to the ' Wallaby international Kane Douglas in the 2015 Rugby World Cup final opened up a space on their roster and Matwijow was selected to fill it. He made 11 appearances in his debut campaign, but Douglas' return to fitness towards the end of the year meant that Matwijow was on the move again, this time heading west to join the Western Force ahead of the 2017 season.

Super Rugby statistics

References

Defensive coach for St Aloysius College in Sydney from 2019 CAS season

1990 births
Living people
Australian people of Polish descent
Australian rugby union players
Rugby union locks
New South Wales Country Eagles players
Canterbury rugby union players
Queensland Reds players
Taranaki rugby union players
Australian expatriate sportspeople in New Zealand
Expatriate rugby union players in New Zealand
Rugby union players from Sydney